Arteriola glomerularis may refer to:

 Afferent arterioles, also known as arteriola glomerularis afferens
 Efferent arteriole, also known as arteriola glomerularis efferens